Being There is an album by Norwegian jazz pianist and composer Tord Gustavsen recorded in December 2006 and released on the ECM label.

Reception 
The Allmusic review by Thom Jurek awarded the album 4 stars, stating: For a recording that unveils itself so gracefully, there is true heft in its presentation. As hinted at on Tord Gustavsen's earlier ECM dates, Being There is the fruit of labor meticulously crafted and dutifully harvested. It is an album of secrets echoed, and questions that are fathomlessly deep; it invites the listener in cleanly, without seduction, and argues for full participation in its revelations.

Track listing
All compositions by Tord Gustavsen except as indicated.

"At Home" (6:08)
"Vicar Street" (3:43)
"Draw Near" (3:54)
"Blessed Feet" (6:06)
"Sani" (2:38)
"Interlude" (2:18)
"Karmosin" (5:10) (Harald Johnsen)
"Still There" (4:19)
"Where We Went" (4:46)
"Cocoon" (5:49)
"Around You" (5:34)
"Vesper" (4:27)
"Wide Open" (4:39)

Personnel 
Tord Gustavsen – piano
Harald Johnsen – bass
Jarle Vespestad – drums

References 

ECM Records albums
Tord Gustavsen albums
2007 albums
Albums produced by Manfred Eicher